The 7th National Hockey League All-Star Game took place at the Montreal Forum, home of the Montreal Canadiens, on October 3, 1953. The Canadiens, winner of the 1953 Stanley Cup Finals, played a team of All-Stars, with the All-Stars winning the game, 3–1.

Game summary

Referee: Red Storey
Linesmen: Sammy Babcock, Doug Davies

Rosters

Notes

Named to the first All-Star team in 1952–53.
Named to the second All-Star team in 1952–53.

Citations

References
 

07th
All-Star Game
1953
Ice hockey competitions in Montreal
1950s in Montreal
1953 in Quebec
October 1953 sports events in Canada